The Coyote (Spanish: El coyote) is a 1955 Mexican-Spanish western film directed by Joaquín Luis Romero Marchent and Fernando Soler and starring Abel Salazar,  Gloria Marín and Manuel Monroy. Based on the character El Coyote created by J. Mallorquí. It was followed by a sequel The Coyote's Justice in 1956.

Plot 
In 1848, the dandy-like Cesar de Echague returned to California from the east of the continent. He finds conditions that oppress his Mexican compatriots and only pursue American interests. A rebellion carried out by the inhabitants was bloodily put down; the leaders imprisoned. During the day, César remains the gentleman he portrays to polite society; At night, however, he becomes a black-masked bandit who sides with the oppressed, and just like Zorro, he leads the insurgents towards their goal: fighting and defeating the oppressors, embodied by the officer of the Northern States, Captain Pots.

Cast
 Abel Salazar as El Coyote / Cesar de Echague  
 Gloria Marín 
 Manuel Monroy 
 Rafael Bardem 
 Santiago Rivero as Captain  
 Antonio García Quijada 
 Mario Moreno 
 Julio Goróstegui
 Xan das Bolas 
 Pepa Bravo 
 Joaquín Burgos 
 José Calvo
 Ignacio de Córdoba 
 Ignacio de Paúl
 Fernando Delgado 
 Luis Domínguez Luna 
 Antonio Fornis 
 Rufino Inglés 
 Mari Sol Luna 
 Héctor Mayro 
 Antonio Molino Rojo 
 Jerónimo Montoro 
 Antonio Moreno 
 Alfredo Muñiz 
 Carlos Otero 
 Miguel Pastor
 José María Prada 
 Vittorio Pronzatto 
 José G. Rey 
 José Riesgo 
 Emilio Rodríguez 
 Lis Rogi 
 Pepa Ruiz 
 Manuel San Román 
 Ángela Tamayo 
 Ángel Álvarez

References

Bibliography 
 de España, Rafael. Directory of Spanish and Portuguese film-makers and films. Greenwood Press, 1994.

External links 
 

1955 films
1955 Western (genre) films
Films directed by Joaquín Luis Romero Marchent
Mexican Western (genre) films
Spanish Western (genre) films
1950s Spanish-language films
Mexican black-and-white films
Spanish black-and-white films
1950s Spanish films
1950s Mexican films